Summer Things (also known as See How They Run) is a 2002 French-British-Italian romantic comedy-drama film written and directed by Michel Blanc, based on the 1998 novel of the same name by Joseph Connolly. The ensemble cast includes Charlotte Rampling, Jacques Dutronc, Carole Bouquet, Michel Blanc, Karin Viard, Gaspard Ulliel and Mélanie Laurent.

The film was released to critical acclaim and was a box-office hit in France. Karin Viard won the César Award for Best Supporting Actress for her performance as Véronique. Gaspard Ulliel won the Lumières Award for Most Promising Actor for his performance as Loïc.

Plot 
Elizabeth and Bertrand are typical representatives of Parisian society. Behind the facade of a perfect marriage is dissatisfaction and boredom. He is a successful real estate agent having fun with much younger women or men behind the back of his wife. She suffers under the crushing uneventful life of a housewife and looks forward to a family holiday with daughter Emily. Bertrand backs out at the last minute and sends in his place Julie, Elizabeth's best friend and his former lover. He is free for a new love affair in Paris. The neighbors, Véro and Jérôme have very different problems. Jérôme is unemployed and collects gas meters. He hides his feelings of failure from Véro and son Loic. Since Véro wants to keep up with the neighbors, both families end up in the same resort. Numerous mistakes, misunderstandings and surprises are inevitable.

Cast 
 Charlotte Rampling as Elizabeth Lannier
 Jacques Dutronc as Bertrand Lannier
 Carole Bouquet as Lulu
 Michel Blanc as Jean-Pierre
 Karin Viard as Véronique
 Denis Podalydès as Jérôme
 Clotilde Courau as Julie
 Vincent Elbaz as Maxime
 Lou Doillon as Emilie
 Sami Bouajila as Kévin
 Gaspard Ulliel as Loïc
 Mélanie Laurent as Carole

Reception

Critical response
On Rotten Tomatoes, the film holds an approval rating of 100%, based on 6 reviews, with an average rating of 7.4/10.

AlloCiné, a French cinema website, gave the film an average rating of 4.0/5, based on a survey of 23 French reviews.

Box office
In France, Summer Things was released to 408 screens, where it debuted at number three at the box office, selling 480,951 tickets. It sold a total of 1,336,579 tickets after 6 weeks in cinemas, ranking at number 24 of the highest-grossing films in France in 2002. The film grossed a total of $8,738,101 worldwide.

Accolades

References

External links
 

2002 films
2002 drama films
2002 comedy films
2002 romantic comedy-drama films
Films based on British novels
British romantic comedy-drama films
Italian romantic comedy-drama films
Films directed by Michel Blanc
French LGBT-related films
British LGBT-related films
Italian LGBT-related films
LGBT-related romantic comedy-drama films
Films featuring a Best Supporting Actress César Award-winning performance
2002 LGBT-related films
2000s French-language films
French romantic comedy-drama films
2000s British films
2000s French films